Higor Felippe Borges Felix (born 7 April 1998), simply known as Higor, is a Brazilian footballer who plays as a forward for Portuguese club A.D. Camacha.

Club career
Born in Belo Horizonte, Minas Gerais, Higor joined Santos' youth setup in 2016, after stints at Cruzeiro and América Mineiro. In January 2018, he joined Villa Nova on loan until the end of the year's Campeonato Mineiro.

Higor made his professional debut on 11 March 2018, coming on as a second-half substitute in a 1–1 home draw against former club América Mineiro. He returned to Peixe in April, being assigned to the B-team.

On 13 December 2018, Higor returned to Villa Nova also in a temporary deal.

Career statistics

References

External links

Eleven Soccer profile 
Higor Felix at ZeroZero

1998 births
Living people
Footballers from Belo Horizonte
Brazilian footballers
Association football forwards
América Futebol Clube (MG) players
Cruzeiro Esporte Clube players
Santos FC players
Villa Nova Atlético Clube players
Clube do Remo players
Campeonato de Portugal (league) players
A.D. Camacha players
Brazilian expatriate footballers
Brazilian expatriate sportspeople in Portugal
Expatriate footballers in Portugal